Survivors is an album by American jazz drummer Max Roach recorded in 1984 for the Italian Soul Note label.

Reception
The Allmusic review by Ron Wynn awarded the album 3 stars stating "this serves as a powerful reminder of why Roach's drumming was so strong and visceral even in his older years, and how fertile his imagination continued to be".

Track listing
All compositions by Max Roach except as indicated
 "Survivors" (Peter Phillips, Max Roach) - 21:28 
 "The Third Eye" - 2:10 
 "Billy the Kid" - 2:57 
 "JasMe" - 3:37 
 "The Drum Also Waltzes" - 3:18 
 "Sassy Max (Self Portrait)" - 3:20 
 "The Smoke That Thunders" - 5:47 
Recorded at Vanguard Studios in New York City on October 19, 20 & 21, 1984

Personnel
Max Roach - drums, percussion
Guillermo Figueroa, Donald Bauch - violin (track 1)
Louise Schulman - viola (track 1)
Christopher Finckel - cello (track 1)

References

Black Saint/Soul Note albums
Max Roach albums
1984 albums